City Township is the smallest of the fifteen townships that make up Barton County, Missouri, USA.  As of the 2000 census, its population was 4,425. Despite being the smallest township by area, it is the most populous township. The township government is consolidated with the government of the city of Lamar.

Geography
According to the USGS, it contains one cemetery, East Side. City Township is completely surrounded by Lamar Township.

References

 USGS Geographic Names Information System (GNIS)

External links
 US-Counties.com
 City-Data.com

Townships in Barton County, Missouri
Townships in Missouri